Edward Takarinda Sadomba (born 31 August 1983) is a Zimbabwean former professional footballer who played as a forward.

Career
Born in Harare, Sadomba played for Harare United, Kambuzuma United, Maritzburg United, Dynamos, Liga Desportiva de Maputo, Al-Hilal, Al-Ittihad Kalba, Al-Ahly (Benghazi) and Al-Ahli (Tripoli).

He represented Zimbabwe between 2006 and 2014, scoring one goal in 15 appearances.

In January 2019, Sadomba returned from his retirement and signed with his former club Dynamos. After manager Lloyd Chigove was fired, Sadomba was appointed as Dynamos' caretaker manager alongside Richard Chihoro on 23 April 2019, before Tonderai Ndiraya was appointed as permanent manager at the end of that week.

References

1983 births
Living people
Sportspeople from Harare
Zimbabwean footballers
Zimbabwe international footballers
Maritzburg United F.C. players
Dynamos F.C. players
Liga Desportiva de Maputo players
Al-Hilal Club (Omdurman) players
Al-Ittihad Kalba SC players
Al-Ahly SC (Benghazi) players
Al-Ahli SC (Tripoli) players
UAE Pro League players
Association football forwards
Zimbabwean expatriate footballers
Zimbabwean expatriate sportspeople in South Africa
Expatriate soccer players in South Africa
Zimbabwean expatriate sportspeople in Mozambique
Expatriate footballers in Mozambique
Zimbabwean expatriate sportspeople in Sudan
Expatriate footballers in Sudan
Zimbabwean expatriate sportspeople in the United Arab Emirates
Expatriate footballers in the United Arab Emirates
Zimbabwean expatriate sportspeople in Libya
Expatriate footballers in Libya
Libyan Premier League players